Tariq Ali (born 1943) is a British political activist, writer, and historian.

Tariq Ali, and other variants such as Tarek El Ali, may also refer to:

 Tariq Ali, Pakistan Navy admiral
 Tariq Al-Ali (born 1966), Kuwaiti actor
 Tarek El Ali (born 1986), Lebanese footballer
 Tariq Khan (actor) (Tariq Ali Khan; born 1951), Indian actor
 Tarek Ali Hassan (born 1937), Egyptian academic and musician
 Tarek Ali Abdullah Ahmed Baada, Yemeni detainee in Guantanamo Bay
 Mir Tariq Ali Khan Talpur, Pakistani politician

See also
 Ali Tarek (born 1978), Egyptian fencer
 Tariq (disambiguation)
 Ali (disambiguation)